Champagne for Caesar is a 1950 American comedy film about a quiz show contestant. It was directed by Richard Whorf and written by Fred Brady and Hans Jacoby. The movie stars Ronald Colman, Celeste Holm, Vincent Price, Barbara Britton and Art Linkletter. The film was produced by Harry M. Popkin for his Cardinal Pictures and released by United Artists.

Plot

Beauregard Bottomley is a polymath who lives in Los Angeles with his piano-instructor sister Gwenn and an alcohol-guzzling parrot they found named Caesar (voiced by Mel Blanc). Beauregard is knowledgeable on any subject—except how to hold a job.

Beauregard and Gwenn watch a quiz show, Masquerade for Money, hosted by Happy Hogan, and sponsored by Milady Soap. Each contestant dresses up in a particular costume, which  determines the type of questions asked, with the prize money doubling with each correct answer, starting at $5 and reaching a maximum of $160. A contestant can quit anytime, but an incorrect response results in no money won. Beauregard is contemptuous of the show.

A representative of the State of California Department of Employment encourages Beauregard to interview for a job at the Milady Soap Company. Beauregard meets the company's eccentric owner, Burnbridge Waters, who disapproves of Beauregard's humor and rejects him  To get even, Beauregard enters Masquerade for Money, dressed as an encyclopedia, which means the host can ask him about anything.  Before the questions begin, Happy starts to praise the qualities of Milady Soap, but Beauregard says that it works just like any other soap, outraging Waters. Beauregard easily answers the maximum six questions, then requests one more, which he also answers, earning $320. Beauregard turns down the money and asks to return next week.

Waters invites Beauregard back for one question per show for six weeks and heavily publicizes it.  "Masquerade for Money" tops the ratings, and sales of Milady Soap skyrocket.

At the end of that time, Waters approves of giving Beauregard an impossibly hard question, but when Beauregard answers it correctly, Waters becomes uneasy. Happy offers to take piano lessons from Gwenn to try to find a weakness in Beauregard.  Beauregard sees through the scheme, but Gwenn sneaks out on a date with Happy anyway.  When Gwenn tells Happy that she and her brother think that he is just trying to get information from her, he admits that he is but also says that he is glad to have met her.  Gwenn tells Happy that Beauregard intends to win $40 million, to take everything that Waters has.  Happy tells Waters, who cancels the show and sends Beauregard a check for his current winnings ($40,000), which Beauregard refuses to accept.

Sales for Milady Soap plummet, forcing Waters to reinstate the show. Beauregard reaches $10 million. Waters calls in a scheming "Flame" O'Neill to distract Beauregard.  Beauregard catches a cold from being in a rainstorm, so Flame pretends to be a nurse to him. Beauregard is aware of, but nevertheless quickly succumbs to, Flame's charms (as does Waters). The night of the show, Beauregard states that he never mastered Albert Einstein's "space-time theories". The next question is, of course, about Einstein's views of space-time. Realizing Flame has betrayed him, Beauregard initially struggles but eventually comes up with an answer.  Happy says that it is incorrect.  However, Einstein himself telephones before the end of the show to say that the answer is correct. Afterward, Beauregard confronts Flame, who has fallen for him.  Unaware of this, Beauregard spanks her with her hairbrush and informs her that he deliberately misled her, that he actually "spent an entire season with Einstein", but also admits that he has fallen in love with her.

Waters books the Hollywood Bowl for the last show. Happy and Gwenn and Beauregard and Flame each plan to marry. Beauregard and Gwenn caution each other that their would-be spouses could be just after the money. Each calls and suggests marrying before the show, but Happy and Flame each come up with excuses.

For the final question, Happy asks Beauregard what his Social Security number is. Beauregard answers incorrectly. After the show, to the joy of Beauregard and Gwenn, Flame and Happy still want to marry them. Waters shows up at Beauregard's home, bearing gifts, including champagne.  (Caesar used to be Waters' pet.) As Beauregard and Flame drive to Las Vegas to get married, Beauregard reveals that he and Waters had made a deal in which Beauregard would lose in exchange for getting his own radio show, some stock, and other considerations. Beauregard was motivated to make such a deal because two Treasury agents had signaled their intent to tax a significant amount of his winnings.  Beauregard then admits that he actually did not know the answer.

Cast

Reception
In his 1950 review of the film in The New York Times, Bosley Crowther panned the film, sparing only Holm:
"Some of his [Vincent Price's] broad aberrations offer faintly satirical thrusts at advertising genius, but most of them are duds. Mr. Coleman's exquisite urbanity wears awfully thin as time goes on. ... With Celeste Holm playing the charmer, there is some evident reason, at least, for the hero's infatuation. But with a chap named Art Linkletter cast as the quiz-master, we cannot fathom the basis for the sister's romance."

Contemporary criticism of the story indicated that the film violated Beauregard's criticism of the nature of quiz shows in its final plot twist, with Beauregard being given his own quiz show - unless Beauregard were to use the opportunity to reform quiz shows by having one that is truly intellectually stimulating.

Nicholas Laham has analysed the treatment of Beauregard as a highly educated, yet unemployable, character in the context of how scholars were regarded in the 1950s, and in anticipation of the unemployment of information-based, highly educated people in later decades in the information age/"new economy". Laham also places Champagne for Caesar in the historical lineage of screwball comedy, over a decade after that genre had reached its peak before World War II.

References

External links
 
 American Movie Channels page on Champagne for Caesar

1950 films
1950 romantic comedy films
American black-and-white films
American romantic comedy films
Films scored by Dimitri Tiomkin
Films about television
Films directed by Richard Whorf
Films set in Los Angeles
Films about quizzes and game shows
United Artists films
1950s English-language films
1950s American films